The scarlet-throated tanager (Compsothraupis loricata) is a small passerine bird in the tanager family Thraupidae that is endemic to eastern Brazil.  It is the only member of the genus Compsothraupis.

The scarlet-throated tanager is one of the largest tanagers;  in length and with a weight of 72.5g. Females are entirely black, while males have red throat. It is endemic to north-eastern Brazil, being almost entirely restricted to the region dominated by Caatinga. Typically seen in pairs or groups of up to 8 individuals. Has a habit of perching on branches high in trees. Slow-moving. In the breeding season, males fluff the feathers of the back to show off the white bases. The nest is well hidden, and typically placed deep in vegetation or in an abandoned woodpeckers hole.

Taxonomy
The scarlet-throated tanager was formally described in 1819 by the German naturalist Hinrich Lichtenstein under the binomial name Tanagra loricata. Lichtenstein based his description on the Jacapú that had been described in 1648 by Georg Marcgrave. The type locality is northeastern Brazil. The scarlet-throated tanager is now the only member of the genus Compsothraupis that was introduced in 1915 by the American ornithologist Charles Wallace Richmond. The genus name is formed from the Ancient Greek kompsos meaning "pretty" with thraupis, an unknown small bird. In ornithology thraupis is used to signify a tanager. The specific epithet loricata is from the Latin loricatus  meaning "clothed in mail" or "breast-plated". The scarlet-throated tanager is monotypic: no subspecies are recognised.

References

External links
 Photos and text - arthurgrosset.com

scarlet-throated tanager
Birds of the Caatinga
Endemic birds of Brazil
scarlet-throated tanager